Luisa Cavendish Arraes (born 15 August 1993) is a Brazilian actress.

Early life 
Arraes was born in Rio de Janeiro, the daughter of filmmaker Guel Arraes and actress Virginia Cavendish, both from Pernambuco state. She was cousin of the former governor of Pernambuco Eduardo Campos and granddaughter of the also former governor of Pernambuco Miguel Arraes.

Career 
Her first appearance on the big screens was in a film of her father, Lisbela e o Prisioneiro, in a small participation. In 2013 she participated in the Brazilian film A Busca, where she made a scene with actor Wagner Moura. But Luisa Arraes only became known after interpreting the sweet and romantic Laís Pimenta, in Babilônia, novel of Rede Globo. In the novel, she made a romantic pair with the Brazilian actor Chay Suede, becoming one of the highlights of the telenovela. Before Babilônia, Luisa was part of Louco por Elas, a series starring Deborah Secco and Eduardo Moscovis, where she gave life to Barbara, a sulky teenager with insecurities. Luisa also has works in the theater, currently is in poster with the play Pedro Malzarte e a Arara Gigante along with the actor George Sauma, that also is her boyfriend in real life.

Filmography

Television

Film

Theater

Awards and nominations

References

External links 
 
 

1993 births
Living people
Actresses from Rio de Janeiro (city)
Brazilian telenovela actresses
Brazilian stage actresses
Brazilian film actresses
21st-century Brazilian actresses
Arraes family